Spartan Gold is the first in the "Fargo series" of adventure novels by Clive Cussler, co-authored by Grant Blackwood.  The two main characters of the Fargo novels are adventurers and treasure hunters Sam Fargo and his wife, Remi.  The book's hardcover edition was first published September 1, 2009.  The Paperback version was released on August 31, 2010.  Other editions of this novel were released on various dates after the hardcover edition's debut.

Plot
Clive Cussler introduces a new team of adventurers with this book, the Fargos, who have a knack for stumbling into the plots of evil egomaniacs. This adventure starts when they stumble across a one-man World War II German midget submarine, which is still intact. Inside, they find a bottle that they discover came from Napoleon's "lost wine cellar." Immediately, representatives of power-hungry millionaire Hadeon Bondaruk attempts to get the bottle at any cost. They begin a quest to discover why this bottle so important that Bondaruk is willing to kill to get it. This adventure takes the Fargos to the Bahamas and over much of Europe before they discover Bondaruk's evil plans for regional domination.

Co-author Clive Cussler has a habit of making cameo appearances in many of his novels.  In this one he makes a brief appearance when the Fargos are hunting for one of Napoleon's wine bottles on Rum Cay, in the Bahamas.

Reviews
The Amazon.com website, as of October 2015, had 322 customer reviews of Spartan Gold and the reviewers gave the book an average of three stars out of five stars.  The Good Reads website as of the same date had 501 reviews of the book.  Reviewers gave it an average of 3.8 stars of five possible stars. The Barns & Noble website as of the same date had 298 reviews of the book.  Reviewers gave it an average of 3.7 stars of five possible stars.

References

2009 American novels
Fargo Adventures
G. P. Putnam's Sons books
Collaborative novels